The first show in 2006 was hosted by Katt Williams in Atlanta.

Performances
 "Welcome to Atlanta" (Remix) – Jermaine Dupri feat. Ludacris, Young Jeezy and Lil Jon
 "That's That" – Snoop Dogg
 "Stuntin' Like My Daddy" – Birdman and Lil Wayne
 "Push It" / "Hustlin'" – Rick Ross
 "Grew Up a Screw Up" – Ludacris feat. Young Jeezy
 "One Blood" / "Let's Ride" – The Game feat. Junior Reid
 "Top Back" (Remix) – T.I. feat. Young Dro, Big Kuntry King and B.G.
 "I Luv It" – Young Jeezy
 "We Fly High" – Jim Jones feat. Juelz Santana
 "Walk It Out" – Unk
 Cypher 1 – Papoose, Lupe Fiasco and Styles P
 Cypher 2 – Remy Ma, Saigon, Sway DaSafo and Rhymefest, with DJ Scratch

Winners
 Hip Hop Video of the Year: "What You Know" – T.I.
 Element Award: Video Director of the Year: Hype Williams
 Hip Hop Track of the Year: "It's Goin' Down" – Yung Joc feat. Nitti
 Rookie of the Year: Chamillionaire
 Element Award: Producer of the Year: Jermaine Dupri
 Hip Hop MVP of the Year: T.I.
 Element Award – Lyricist of the Year: Common
 Element Award – Best Hip Hop Dance of the Year: Snap
 Best Hip Hop Movie: ATL
 Best Live Performance: Busta Rhymes
 Move the Crowd Award: Busta Rhymes
 Hip Hop CD of the Year: King – T.I.
 Hip Hop Hustler Award: Jay Z
 Alltel Wireless People's Champ Award: "Ridin'" – Chamillionaire feat. Krayzie Bone
 Best UK Hip Hop Act (BET International): Sway DaSafo
 BET Hot Ringtone Award: "Shoulder Lean" – Young Dro feat. T.I.
 Best Collaboration: "Touch It" (Remix) – Busta Rhymes featuring Mary J. Blige, Rah Digga, Missy Elliott, Lloyd Banks, Papoose & DMX
 I Am Hip-Hop Icon Award: Grandmaster Flash

References

BET Hip Hop Awards
2006 music awards